William J. Corcoran is a Canadian film and television director.

As a television director his credits include Friday the 13th, Alfred Hitchcock Presents, 21 Jump Street,  Wiseguy, MacGyver, Hope Island, New York Undercover, Mutant X, Stargate SG-1, Pensacola: Wings of Gold, and The Immortal among other series. He has also directed a number of television films.

Corcoran graduated from Trent University.

References

External links

Canadian television directors
Living people
Film directors from Toronto
1951 births